Mayes Airport  was an privately owned, public use airport located four nautical miles (7 km) north-northwest of the central business district of Carson City, in Montcalm County, Michigan, United States. Although an exact date is not known, it is believed the airport closed sometime in 2008.

Facilities and aircraft 
Mayes Airport covered an area of 40 acres (16 ha) at an elevation of 790 feet (241 m) above mean sea level. It had two runways with turf surfaces: 10/28 was 2,300 by 100 feet (701 x 30 m) and 18/36 was 2,200 by 100 feet (671 x 30 m) with an turf surface.

For the 12-month period ending December 31, 2005, the airport had 248 general aviation aircraft operations, an average of 20 per month. At that time there were six aircraft based at this airport, all single-engine.

References

External links 
 Aerial image as of April 1999 from USGS The National Map

Airports in Michigan
Defunct airports in Michigan
Transportation in Montcalm County, Michigan